The National Coach Museum is located on the Afonso de Albuquerque Square in the Belém district of Lisbon in Portugal. The museum has one of the finest collections of historical carriages in the world and is one of the most visited museums of the city.

History
The museum was formerly housed in the Royal Riding Hall of Belém, the former home of the Portuguese School of Equestrian Art, known as the Picadeiro Real. The Picadeiro Real is part of the larger Belém Palace complex, formerly a Royal Palace, which is now the official residence of the President of Portugal. The Horse Riding Area was built after 1787, following the Neoclassical design of Italian architect Giacomo Azzolini. Several Portuguese artists decorated the interior of the building with paintings and tile (azulejo) panels. The inner arena is 50 m long and 17 m wide, and was used for training horses and for horse riding exhibitions and games, which could be watched from its balconies by the Portuguese royal family. Since 2015, the bulk of the collection has been housed in a new museum situated close to the Picadeiro Real, but the original museum area can still be visited and contains six coaches and other exhibits.

The original museum was created in 1905 by Queen Amélia to house an extensive collection of carriages belonging to the Portuguese royal family and nobility. The collection gives a full picture of the development of carriages from the late 16th through the 19th centuries, with carriages made in Italy, Portugal, France, Spain, Austria and England.

Among its rarest items is a late 16th/early 17th-century travelling coach used by King Philip II of Portugal (Philip III of Spain) to come from Spain to Portugal in 1619. There are also several Baroque 18th century carriages decorated with paintings and exuberant gilt woodwork, the most impressive of these being a ceremonial coach given by Pope Clement XI to King John V in 1715, and the three coaches of the Portuguese ambassador to Pope Clement XI, built in Rome in 1716.

A section of the museum is also located in the Ducal Palace of Vila Viçosa, in Southern Portugal.

References

External links

The National Coach Museum on Google Arts & Culture
 "Paulo Mendes da Rocha / Museu Nacional dos Coches" by Gonçalo M. Tavares, Ana Vaz Milheiro and João Carmo Simões, Lisbon: Monade, 2015.
 National Coach Museum official website

Museums in Lisbon
Carriage museums
Belém (Lisbon)
History museums in Portugal
Transport museums in Portugal
1905 establishments in Portugal
Museums established in 1905